Philipp Schrangl (born 14 March 1985) is an Austrian politician who has been a Member of the National Council for the Freedom Party of Austria (FPÖ) since 2013.

References

1985 births
Living people
Members of the National Council (Austria)
Freedom Party of Austria politicians